The Mogilyov uezd was one of the uezds (uyezds or subdivisions) of the Podolia Governorate of the Russian Empire. It was situated in the western part of the governorate. Its administrative centre was Mohyliv-Podilskyi (Mogilyov-Podolsky).

Demographics
At the time of the Russian Empire Census of 1897, Mogilyovsky Uyezd had a population of 227,672. Of these, 80.5% spoke Ukrainian, 14.5% Yiddish, 2.8% Russian, 1.9% Polish, 0.1% German and 0.1% Tatar as their native language.

References

 
Uezds of Podolia Governorate